Dale Susan Fischer (born October 17, 1951) is a United States district judge of the United States District Court for the Central District of California.

Early life and education
Born in Orange, New Jersey, Fischer received her Bachelor of Arts degree from the University of South Florida in 1977, and her Juris Doctor from Harvard Law School in 1980.

Law career
Fischer was in private practice in California from 1980 to 1997.  She was a judge on the Los Angeles Municipal Court from 1997 to 2000, and on the Los Angeles Superior Court from 2000 to 2003.

On May 1, 2003, Fischer was nominated by President George W. Bush to a new seat on the United States District Court for the Central District of California created by 116 Stat. 1758. She was confirmed by the United States Senate on October 27, 2003, and received her commission on November 5, 2003.

References

External links

1951 births
Living people
21st-century American judges
21st-century American women judges
California state court judges
Harvard Law School alumni
Judges of the United States District Court for the Central District of California
People from Orange, New Jersey
Superior court judges in the United States
United States district court judges appointed by George W. Bush
University of South Florida alumni